Ad. Ainaro or Associação Desportiva Ainaro is a football club of East Timor from Ainaro. The team plays in the Taça Digicel.

References

Football clubs in East Timor
Football
Ainaro Municipality
Association football clubs established in 2010
2010 establishments in East Timor